Freedom's Frontier National Heritage Area, Inc. (FFNHA) is a federally designated U.S. National Heritage Area located in eastern Kansas and Western Missouri. This heritage area preserves, conserves, and interprets historic and cultural landscapes pertaining to: the shaping of the frontier, the Missouri-Kansas Border War, and the enduring struggle for freedom. FFNHA was authorized on October 12, 2006, with the passage of the National Heritage Areas Act of 2006.  The management plan for the heritage area was approved by the Board of Trustees on June 10, 2009, and undergoes official review by the National Park Service to ensure it complies with all components required within the enabling legislation.

Mission and Themes 
The focus of the FFNHA is to share the stories of 19th century Americans and their definitions and struggles with freedom. Many of the sites focus on the Bleeding Kansas and American Civil War years, but there are several locations that deal with 20th century events and the ecology of Kansas and Missouri. According to the FFNHA's website:Freedom's Frontier is a “story ecosystem” defined by the history that unifies the region. The overarching theme of FFNHA is Freedom. Each of the three sub-themes connects to the ideal of freedom and clearly states why the area's resources and values are important enough to warrant federal designation of the area. The main sub-theme is the Missouri Kansas Border War, consisting of interpretations of the years of uneasy balance established by the Missouri Compromise leaving the territory's future slave status in the hands of settlers and ushering in the Civil War. Additional sub-themes include Shaping the Frontier, interpreting this place where river travel ended and traders, miners, and emigrants began the long overland treks beyond Missouri's western border, pushing Native American populations aside in the process, and the Enduring Struggles for Freedom, interpreting stories of this place that has inspired national policies and ongoing efforts to secure equal freedoms for all Americans.The FFNHA also gives out several grants and awards as well as supporting educators with additional curriculum and scholarships.

Historic Sites 
There are several notable historic sites located in the FFNHA.

 Mahaffie Stagecoach Stop and Farm
 Battle of Island Mound State Historic Site
 Amelia Earhart Birthplace Museum
 Pony Express National Museum
 Negro Leagues Baseball Museum
 Black Archives of Mid-America
 National Frontier Trails Museum
 Constitution Hall State Historic Site - Lecompton
 Watkins Museum
 Flint Hills Discovery Center
 National World War I Museum and Memorial

National Parks 

 Brown v. Board of Education National Historic Site
 Fort Larned National Historic Site
 Fort Scott National Historic Site
 Harry S. Truman National Historic Site
 Oregon National Historic Trail

References

External links
FFNHA Official Website
FFNHA APP
National Heritage Areas Program, National Park Service
FFNHA, National Park Service
FFNHA Themes
Statement of FFNHA's National Significance
FFNHA's Vision, Mission and Guiding Principles
FFNHA's Counties 
FFNHA's Enabling Legislation

National Heritage Areas of the United States
Protected areas established in 2006
2006 establishments in Missouri
Protected areas of Kansas
Protected areas of Missouri
2006 establishments in Kansas